Clearing House (formerly, Clearinghouse) is an unincorporated community in Mariposa County, California.

The Clearinghouse post office operated from 1913 to 1933. The place name comes from the Clearinghouse Mine, so named as it was an exchange place for gold bullion and certificates during the Panic of 1907.

The Yosemite Mill was near this site; it still appeared on maps as of 1867.

References

Unincorporated communities in Mariposa County, California
Merced River
1913 establishments in California
Unincorporated communities in California